The Charlie Brown Suite & Other Favorites is a 2003 compilation album by jazz pianist Vince Guaraldi released by RCA/Bluebird Records. The album is a mix of previously released material, newly discovered studio recordings, plus an archived 1969 live concert recording entitled The Charlie Brown Suite.

Background
The Charlie Brown Suite & Other Favorites is the result of efforts made by Vince Guaraldi's son, David, to secure the rights needed to distribute some of his father's previously unreleased material.

The centerpiece selection is the orchestrated, 40-minute Charlie Brown Suite, originally taped live on a reel-to-reel audio tape recording device on May 18, 1969, during a benefit performance at Mr. D's, a theater/restaurant in San Francisco's North Beach region. The orchestral accompaniment was performed by chamber ensemble Amici Della Musica, under the direction of Welsh conductor Richard Williams.

The archived recording was acquired from Guaraldi's ex-wife, Shirley, by New Age pianist George Winston. A lifelong Guaraldi fan, Winston ultimately provided David Guaraldi with the concert recording, who, along with producer Dawn Atkinson, assembled the tapes for remastering and "sweetening" to make the concert more presentable for a mainstream release. The suite itself is divided into seven separate movements, connecting the Peanuts songs into an integrated whole.

The release also features a big band rendition of "Linus and Lucy" that was included on the 1973 holiday television special A Charlie Brown Thanksgiving. Also included is an undated live nightclub recording of Guaraldi's non-Peanuts signature tune, "Cast Your Fate to the Wind".

Cover art
The cover art is a modified replica originally used for the 1964 release Jazz Impressions of A Boy Named Charlie Brown with a caricature of Guaraldi's head replacing an actual head shot of Guaraldi.

Critical reception
Despite the wealth of material Guaraldi recorded for the Peanuts television specials, only three albums were commercially released during his lifetime: Jazz Impressions of A Boy Named Charlie Brown (1964), A Charlie Brown Christmas (1965) and Oh Good Grief! (1968). Charlie Brown's Holiday Hits (1998) was the first new posthumous compilation of previously unavailable material, released over two decades after Guaraldi's premature death. The Charlie Brown Suite & Other Favorites became the second posthumous release, providing a different interpretation of Guaraldi's ubiquitous Peanuts songs.

Guaraldi historian Derrick Bang commented that the arrangement "skillfully weaves half a dozen songs into an integrated whole." AllMusic critic Thom Jurek said, "the seemingly simple harmonics and snappy melodies that comprised the Charlie Brown pieces are merely the springboard for dizzying, dreamy, and rhythmically advanced, sophisticated composition and arrangement," adding that the suite contains "great treasures in American music and haunted by childlike nursery rhymes while being saturated in jazz; they comprise something unique in the vernacular and are a sheer, warm delight for virtually anyone but the most snobbish and harmonically challenged to listen to."

Billboard commented that "Charles M. Schulz's celebrated characters are brought to life in Guaraldi's orchestral arrangements, to which he contributes his own sublime meditations on Charlie Brown, Linus and the gang. Guaraldi's musicianship is top-notch. He leads the ensemble through a rocking 'Peppermint Patty,' pounding a bassline with his left hand while dashing off boogie-style runs with his right. Conversely, the delicate 'Rain, Rain Go Away' and 'The Charlie Brown Theme' ['Oh, Good Grief!'] are pretty, almost melancholy contemplations."

Track listing
Incorrectly titled tracks appear in parenthesis along with their proper titles.

Personnel

The Charlie Brown Suite
Vince Guaraldi Trio
Vince Guaraldi – piano
 Peter Marshall – electric bass
 Bob Belanski – drums
with
 Amici Della Musica – orchestral accompaniment
 Richard Williams – conductor

"Cast Your Fate to the Wind" (live)
Vince Guaraldi Quartet
Vince Guaraldi – piano
Eddie Duran – guitar
Fred Marshall – bass
John Waller – drums

Additional
 David Guaraldi – producer, liner notes
 Dawn Atkinson – producer
 Lee Mendelson – liner notes
 Bernie Grundman – mastering
 Charles M. Schulz – cover illustration

References

External links
 

1973 soundtrack albums
2003 compilation albums
1969 live albums
Albums arranged by Vince Guaraldi
Vince Guaraldi albums
Vince Guaraldi soundtracks
Cool jazz soundtracks
Mainstream jazz soundtracks
Peanuts music
Television animation soundtracks
Vince Guaraldi live albums
Vince Guaraldi compilation albums